Samson Tam Wai-ho, JP (born 26 February 1964 in Hong Kong) was an elected member of the Legislative Council of Hong Kong (Functional constituency, Information Technology) from 2008 to 2012. He is the chairman and one of the founders of Group Sense (International) Limited, the manufacturer of "Instant-Dict" Chinese-English electronic dictionary. He graduated from Chinese University of Hong Kong with a BSc degree. Afterwards he was awarded a PhD degree by Hong Kong Polytechnic University. He received "The Young Industrialist Award of Hong Kong" in 1992 and was named one of the “Ten Outstanding Young Persons” in 1997. He is also the president of Kitchee SC.

Samson won the seat of functional constituency (information technology) in the Legislative Council of Hong Kong election in the year 2008, defeating Charles Mok, by 35 votes.

In the run-up to 23 June 2010 Legco vote on the Hong Kong government's 2009 reform package, he offered his support if it included the Democratic Party's compromise proposal to have the five new district council functional constituency seats returned by popular election.

In the year 2012, Samson lost his seat in the Legislative Council of Hong Kong to Charles Mok, by 765 votes.

See also
Politics of Hong Kong
Democratic development in Hong Kong

References

External links
Official site of Samson Tam

1964 births
Living people
Hong Kong businesspeople
Alumni of the Chinese University of Hong Kong
Alumni of the Hong Kong Polytechnic University
HK LegCo Members 2008–2012
Members of the Election Committee of Hong Kong, 2007–2012
Members of the Election Committee of Hong Kong, 2017–2021